Havant Town Football Club was an English football club based in Havant, Hampshire. They ceased to exist in 1998 when they merged with Waterlooville to form Havant & Waterlooville.

History
Havant F.C. were formed in 1883 and played in the Portsmouth League. In 1968 they merged with Leigh Park (who had just won the FA Sunday Cup) to form Havant & Leigh Park. The merged club won the Portsmouth League at the first attempt, and in 1970 stepped up to Division Four of the Hampshire League. After several promotions the club reached Division One by 1977. In order to progress further, the club were seeking to move away from their basic Front Lawn ground. They purchased the site of West Leigh Park in 1980 and moved in in August 1982, at which point the club was renamed Havant Town.

In 1986 the club became founder members of the Wessex League. After winning the league in 1990–91 they were promoted to Division One South of the Southern League, where they remained until merging with nearby Waterlooville F.C. in 1998.

Honours
Wessex League
Champions 1990–91
Portsmouth League
Champions 1958–59

References

External links

Association football clubs established in 1883
Association football clubs disestablished in 1998
Defunct football clubs in Hampshire
Havant
1883 establishments in England
1998 disestablishments in England
Defunct football clubs in England
Portsmouth Saturday Football League
Hampshire League
Wessex Football League
Southern Football League clubs